The Werkstatt-Ø1 is an educational tool and a compact  analog synthesizer from Moog. It was designed to give people a thorough understanding of how synthesizers work. There is only one oscillator with a frequency control allowing tuning from 8Hz up to 16kHz, and a 4-pole ladder filter with cutoff and resonance control.

Assembly
To assemble the Werkstatt-Ø1 you have to screw the printed circuit onto a metal chassis.

See also
Moog modular synthesizer
Multimoog
Micromoog
Moog Rogue
minimoog
Minimoog Voyager

Notes

External links 

Moog synthesizers
Monophonic synthesizers
Analog synthesizers